The Provisional Constitution of the United Arab Republic or the Constitution of 1958 was the constitution for the short-lived political union between Egypt and Syria known as the United Arab Republic (UAR). This 74-article provisional constitution was formulated on 5 March 1958 and lasted until the Syrian coup d'état of 28 September 1961.

The provisional constitution established unitary (rather than federal) state from what had been the Republic of Egypt and the Syrian Republic, although the two parts retained a degree of their own identity de facto.  The UAR was simultaneously in loose confederation with (North) Yemen as the United Arab States, as set out in the Charter of the United Arab States.

The provisional constitution distributed power accordingly to the legislative authority (the National Assembly), the executive authority (represented in the Council of Ministers in addition to the President of the Republic) and the judicial authority.  A joint National Assembly was established; its members were appointed (400 from Egypt and 200 from Syria). It first met on 21 July 1960 and lasted until 22 June 1961.

Following the dissolution of the UAR, the constitution was superseded in Egypt first by a presidential 1962 Constitutional Proclamation, and then by a new "Constitution of the United Arab Republic" (Egypt retained the official name of United Arab Republic until 1971) which was also considered provisional.  In Syria, the Constitution of 1950 was restored until the promulgation of a new provisional constitution in 1964 following the Ba'athist seizure of power the previous year.

References

See also
History of the Egyptian Constitution
Egyptian Constitution of 1879 (abortive)
Egyptian Fundamental Ordinance of 1882
Egyptian Constitution of 1923
Egyptian Constitution of 1930
Egyptian Constitution of 1956
Egyptian Constitution of 1964 ("Constitution of the United Arab Republic", provisional)
Egyptian Constitution of 1971
Egyptian Constitutional Declaration of 2011 (provisional)
Egyptian Constitution of 2012
Egyptian Constitution of 2014

1958 in Egypt
1958 in Syria
1958 in law
1958
1958
United Arab Republic
Politics of Syria
1958 in international relations
United Arab Republic
Egypt–Syria relations
1958 documents